A Dragon at Worlds' End (1997) is a fantasy novel written by Christopher Rowley. The book is the fifth in the Dragons of the Argonath series that follows the adventures of a human boy, Relkin, and his dragon, Bazil Broketail as they fight in the Argonath Legion’s 109th Marneri Dragons.

Plot summary

Trapped and alone on the dark continent of Eigo, Bazil and Relkin learn to fight and live off the dinosaurian wildlife that inhabits the land. During their journey of survival they encounter Lumbee, a female member of the tailed Ardu race. When they find her tribe, Relkin discovers he is in love with the tailed woman, a state that causes great distress to the members of her tribe. He is betrayed by the Ardu and sold to slavers who carry him off to the city of the Elf Lords, Mirchaz. To save his dragonboy, Bazil leads the Ardu in an attack on the slaver’s base, then marches on Mirchaz itself. Relkin has been trapped in a dream world created by an evil Elf Lord. When Bazil comes to the dragonboy’s rescue the pair manages to bring down the Great Game that occupies the Elf Lords and end their rule of Mirchaz. After their victory they return to Argonath from Og Bogon bearing much treasure from an appreciative king.

1997 American novels
Novels by Christopher Rowley
American fantasy novels